The 29th Annual Tony Awards ceremony was held on April 20, 1975, at the Winter Garden Theatre in New York City, and broadcast by ABC television. Hosts/Performers/Presenters were Larry Blyden, George S. Irving, Larry Kert, Carol Lawrence, Michele Lee, Bernadette Peters and Bobby Van.

The ceremony
The theme centered on the Winter Garden Theatre, where many of the greatest stars in theatrical history began their careers.

Presenters: Jack Albertson, Eve Arden, Fred Astaire, Milton Berle, Ray Bolger, Carol Channing, Clifton Davis, Buddy Ebsen, Jack Haley, Angela Lansbury, Jack Lemmon, John V. Lindsay, Cleavon Little, Walter Matthau, Vincente Minnelli, Carl Reiner, Rosalind Russell, Joe Smith, Jean Stapleton.

Performers: Clive Baldwin, Joey Faye, Angela Lansbury, Alexis Smith.

Musicals represented:
 Mame ("Mame" - Angela Lansbury and Men)
 Follies ("The Story of Lucy and Jessie" - Alexis Smith and Dancers)
 Gypsy ("Everything's Coming up Roses" - Angela Lansbury and Company)

Winners and nominees
Winners are in bold

Special awards
Neil Simon, for his plays

Special Award
Al Hirschfeld for 50 years of theatrical cartoons

Multiple nominations and awards

These productions had multiple nominations:

8 nominations: Mack and Mabel and The Wiz  
7 nominations: Goodtime Charley 
6 nominations: Shenandoah   
5 nominations: Equus and Where's Charley? 
4 nominations: The Lieutenant and Sherlock Holmes 
3 nominations: Absurd Person Singular, Dance with Me, Doctor Jazz, Gypsy, The Island, The Misanthrope, The National Health, Same Time, Next Year, Seascape and Sizwe Banzi Is Dead 
2 nominations: Black Picture Show, London Assurance, The Magic Show, The Night That Made America Famous and Scapino!

The following productions received multiple awards.

7 wins: The Wiz   
2 wins: Equus, Shenandoah and Sherlock Holmes

External links
 History Tony Awards Official Site
Winners Tony Awards Official Site
"1975 Tony Awards", InfoPlease, accessed February 15, 2021

Tony Awards ceremonies
1975 in theatre
1975 awards
Tony
1975 in New York City
1970s in Manhattan